University of Mindelo is an institute of higher education in the city of Mindelo, island of São Vicente, Cape Verde. It was established in 2002, and officially started operations on June 9, 2003 as the Instituto de Estudos Superiores Isidoro da Graça. It was converted into the University of Mindelo in 2010.

References

Mindelo
Education in Cape Verde
Educational organizations based in Cape Verde